Hammer & Nail is the second album by Christian metal band Whitecross, released on May 23, 1988. It reached No. 15 on Billboard's Top Contemporary Christian Albums chart. A review in CCM magazine stated that the album "wages war against mediocrity" so often found in Christian metal.

Track listing
"Living on the Edge" (5:13)
"When the Walls Tumble Down" (3:33)
"The Hammer and the Nail" (1:35)
"Take It to the Limit" (4:09)
"Walk with Me" (4:45)
"Because of Jesus" (3:41)
"When the Clock Strikes" (4:34)
"Resist Him" (4:22)
"Living in a Lost World" (3:52)
"Top of the World" (3:43)

Personnel 

 Scott Wenzel – vocals
 Rex Carroll – guitars
 Mark Hedl – drums
 Jon Sproule – bass

References

1988 albums
Whitecross albums